Pon Vilangu is a 1993 Tamil-language drama film directed by debutante director K. S. Rajkumar. The film stars Rahman, Ranjith, Ramya Krishnan and Sivaranjani. It was released on 10 April 1993.

Plot 
Muthu is a daily wage worker whose whole world revolves around his young sister Mallika. Being a short-tempered man who cannot tolerate injustice, Muthu often gets involved in fights furthermore he hates the police. Raani, an avid private moneylender, is in love with Muthu and begins to seduce him in various ways.

His sister Mallika falls in love with the honest police inspector Raghu. Both become very close, spending time together until one day Muthu surprises them. The angry Muthu beats up his sister, and Raani intervenes in time to calm the enraged Muthu. Muthu tells them his tragic past.

In the past, his sister Mallika was just a baby and Muthu's parents were very poor. His jobless father looked for a job to feed the family. The only job that he found required a bicycle, so he purchased a bicycle to an unknown person for a low rate. The next day, the police caught his father and beat him for stealing the collector's bicycle. Knowing the news, his mother ran to the police station and she was raped to death by the drunk police officers. After seeing this atrocity, his father committed suicide in police lock-up.

Since that traumatic event, Muthu starts to hate the police. Mallika understands her brother's feelings and asks him forgiveness, she then tries to forget Raghu. Thereafter, Raani begs Muthu to accept for Mallika's wedding with Raghu. Muthu finally accepts for the wedding but only under one condition : Raghu must resign his police job. Raghu, who has also a tragic past, refuses to resign. What transpires later forms the crux of the story.

Cast 

Rahman as Raghu
Ranjith as Muthu
Ramya Krishnan as Raani
Sivaranjani as Mallika
Veera Pandiyan
Loose Mohan
Krishnamoorthy as Raghu's father
Yuvasri as Raghu's mother
Muthukumar
Arulmani
Bonda Mani as Maari
Mahima
Soundar
Singamuthu

Soundtrack 
The music was composed by Ilaiyaraaja, with lyrics written by Vaali, Muthulingam and Kamakodiyan.

Reception 
Malini Mannath of The New Indian Express gave the film a positive review; she described the film as "an engrossing film centered on the strong bond between a brother and a sister" and praised the lead actors. New Straits Times wrote that the film "keeps you entertained". R. P. R. of Kalki gave a negative review for the film.

References

External links 
 

1990s Tamil-language films
1993 directorial debut films
1993 drama films
1993 films
Films scored by Ilaiyaraaja
Indian drama films